Rolf Johann Stommelen (11 July 1943 – 24 April 1983) was a racing driver from Siegen, Germany. He participated in 63 Formula One World Championship Grands Prix, achieving one podium, and scored a total of 14 championship points. He also participated in several non-Championship Formula One races.

One of the best endurance sports car racing drivers of the 1960s, 1970s and early 1980s, Stommelen won the 24 Hours of Daytona four times; in 1968, 1978, 1980 and 1982 and the Targa Florio in 1967 in a Porsche 910.

Career

Stommelen won the pole position for the 1969 24 Hours of Le Mans in a Porsche 917 a year after finishing third in a Porsche 908. In this year, he became the first man to reach speeds exceeding  on the Le Mans circuit's Mulsanne Straight in his Porsche 917 LH. In 1970, he made his Formula One debut with Brabham with sponsorship obtained from the German magazine Auto, Motor und Sport and raced both sportscars (Toj and Porsche works teams) and Formula 1 throughout the 1970s.

He inadvertently played a role in the end of the Spanish Grand Prix's tenure at Montjuich Park in Barcelona when he crashed there in the 1975 race after the rear wing of his Hill GH1 failed which caused his car to fly into the crowd, resulting in the deaths of five spectators and him being seriously injured.

After his recovery, Stommelen returned to sports car racing, winning races for Alfa Romeo and also winning the 24 Hours of Daytona a further three times.

In 1976 Stommelen had the honour to drive the maiden race of the Porsche 936 at the 300 km Nürburgring race. With a black body and without the air-intake, the 936 of this race became known as the black widow. He qualified second, between the factory Renault Alpine A442 of Patrick Depailler and Jean-Pierre Jabouille in first and third. The Renault team was eager to win at Porsche's home soil. On race-day in heavy rain, Stommelen managed to overtake the Renault in front right after the start. Now in the lead, he rushed towards the Nordkehre, braked and deliberately left room for the Renaults in pursuit to overtake. The Renaults, wanting to take back the lead after 2 of 300 km, rushed past Stommelen into the water puddles and crashed into the catch-fences in tandem, with Stommelen taking back the lead again. This led to the saying "On the Nordschleife, you can never brake later than Rolf Stommelen!". After the sixth lap, the throttle cable of the 936 stuck in the "open" position. But instead of giving up, Stommelen continued the race by turning off the master switch at the bends to brake, and turning on the master switch again after the bends to accelerate throughout the rest of the race, taking second place at the end of the race.

In 1978 he was given the task by the Porsche factory to drive the Porsche 935 "Moby Dick" in Martini Colors. The 78 "Moby Dick" had a 3.2-litre Turbo Engine that produced 845 HP and Stommelen was, with 235 mph, (365 km/h) the fastest man on the Mulsanne Straight, faster than the prototypes like the Porsche 936 and the Renault Alpine A442B which won the race. Due to high fuel-consumption of the engine, Stommelen had to pit too often to battle for the win.

He continued at Le Mans with the Porsche 935, nearly winning the 24 hours of Le Mans with Dick Barbour and actor Paul Newman as co-drivers in 1979, only to be set back by a 23-minute-long pit stop caused by a stuck wheel nut. The team would not have come so far, if Stommelen had not been constantly seconds faster than his team mates each lap.

He also drove Toj SC320 prototype sportscars with some success against the works Alfa team (Toj was a small German manufacturer).

He also competed in one NASCAR Grand National series event in 1971 at Talladega Superspeedway in a former Holman-Moody Ford which Mario Andretti used to win the 1967 Daytona 500, which was rebuilt by Robert Gee (Dale Earnhardt Jr.'s grandfather) as a Mercury Cyclone, with Jake Elder as crew chief.  That car eventually was sold to independent driver Darrell Waltrip to use a year later in his Cup Series debut in 1972, which is how it stands today in the latter's museum.

He was also active in the German GT Championship Deutsche Rennsport Meisterschaft, winning the championship in 1977 for the Gelo Racing Team in a Porsche 935. A master at the Nürburgring, he was a constant winner of races held there.

In the 1980s he was still a sought after prototype pilot and achieved success driving the Kremer CK5, Lancia LC1 and Porsche 956 cars.

Death

Stommelen was killed in a crash during the Los Angeles Times Grand Prix 6 hour International Motor Sports Association GT Championship event at Riverside International Raceway on 24 April 1983. He was competing in a John Fitzpatrick entered Porsche 935 with co-driver Derek Bell. Stommelen had just taken over the car from Bell and was running in second place when the rear wing broke due to mechanical failure at 190 mph (310 km/h). The car became uncontrollable, slammed against a concrete wall, somersaulted and caught fire. Stommelen died of head injuries.

Racing record

24 Hours of Le Mans results

Complete Formula One World Championship results
(key)

Formula One non-championship results
(key) (Races in bold indicate pole position)
(Races in italics indicate fastest lap)

Complete European Formula Two Championship results
(key) (Races in bold indicate pole position; races in italics indicate fastest lap)

 Graded drivers not eligible for  European Formula Two Championship points

Complete British Saloon Car Championship results
(key) (Races in bold indicate pole position; races in italics indicate fastest lap.)

NASCAR
(key) (Bold – Pole position awarded by qualifying time. Italics – Pole position earned by points standings or practice time. * – Most laps led.)

Winston Cup Series

References

1943 births
1983 deaths
24 Hours of Daytona drivers
24 Hours of Le Mans drivers
German Formula One drivers
Surtees Formula One drivers
Eifelland Formula One drivers
Brabham Formula One drivers
Hill Formula One drivers
Hesketh Formula One drivers
Arrows Formula One drivers
German racing drivers
Sportspeople from Siegen
Racing drivers from North Rhine-Westphalia
Racing drivers who died while racing
Sports deaths in California
World Sportscar Championship drivers
NASCAR drivers
Porsche Motorsports drivers
Team Joest drivers